Belkaya Dam is a dam in Burdur Province, Turkey. It was built between 1993 and 2003.

See also
List of dams and reservoirs in Turkey

External links
DSI

Dams in Burdur Province
Dams completed in 2003